Up the Establishment is a 1969 West German comedy film directed by Michael Verhoeven and starring Mario Adorf, Gila von Weitershausen and Ulli Koch.

Partial cast
 Mario Adorf as Augustin 'Gustl' Wohlfahrt
 Gila von Weitershausen as Helene Wohlfahrt
 Ulli Koch as Walter Holl
Christof Wackernagel as Wimpie Brückner
 Dieter Augustin as Dr. Florian 'Flori' Kainz
 Ilse Pagé as Inge
 Gert Wiedenhofen as Schenk
 Inken Sommer as Kundin
 Günter Clemens as Briefträger
 Elisabeth Volkmann as Frau Schubert

References

Bibliography
 Reimer, Robert C. & Reimer, Carol J. The A to Z of German Cinema. Scarecrow Press, 2010.

External links

1969 films
1969 comedy films
German comedy films
West German films
1960s German-language films
Films directed by Michael Verhoeven
Constantin Film films
1960s German films